Crime Pays may refer to:

 Crime Pays (Willie Colón album), 1973
 Crime Pays (Cam'ron album), 2009
 "Crime Pays" (Bear Hands song), 2010